Madyan (Pashto and ) is a popular hill station, located at a distance of about  from Mingora, in the Swat District of Khyber Pakhtunkhwa the Province of Pakistan. It is a tourist destination, and thousands of tourists from all over Pakistan visit this town each year especially in summer enjoying the cold breeze of Swat River. Madyan is famous for its trout fish. Agriculture and tourism related businesses like handicrafts outlets, restaurants and hotels are the main sources of income, although a small fraction is working abroad specially in gulf countries. Madyan valley is known all over the district because of its perfect weather condition. Tourists are attracted by the transparent and colorless water flows in a stream, begins from Beshigram (بشیگرام) Valley and meets with Swat River.

See also 
 Mingora
 Swat Valley

References 

Swat District
Swat Kohistan
Hill stations in Pakistan